Naoufal Bannis (born 11 March 2002) is a Dutch professional footballer who plays as a forward for Eerste Divisie club Eindhoven, on loan from Feyenoord.

Club career
Bannis joined the youth academy of Feyenoord in 2016, after stints with the academies of Haaglandia and ADO Den Haag. On 24 May 2018, he signed his first professional contract with Feyenoord. Bannis made his professional debut with Feyenoord in a 2–2 Eredivisie tie with Sparta Rotterdam on 4 August 2019. On 1 November 2020, he scored his first goal for Feyenoord, scoring the third goal in the 94th minute in a 3–2 win.

In January 2021, Bannis joined FC Dordrecht on loan for the remainder of the 2020–21 season.

In January 2022, Bannis extended his contract by a year to mid-2022 and joined NAC Breda of the Eerste Divisie on loan for the remainder of the season.

On 18 July 2022, Bannis joined Eindhoven on a new loan.

International career
Born in the Netherlands, Bannis is of Moroccan descent. Bannis is a youth international for the Netherlands, and helped them win the 2019 UEFA European Under-17 Championship.

Career statistics

Honours
Netherlands U17
UEFA European Under-17 Championship: 2019

References

External links
 Career stats & profile - Voetbal International
 Ons Oranje U16 Profile
 Ons Oranje U17 Profile
 Ons Oranje U18 Profile

2002 births
Living people
Footballers from The Hague
Dutch footballers
Netherlands youth international footballers
Association football forwards
Feyenoord players
FC Dordrecht players
NAC Breda players
FC Eindhoven players
Eredivisie players
Eerste Divisie players
Dutch sportspeople of Moroccan descent